Arthur Murrell (28 October 1891 – 5 April 1962) was a South African cricketer. He played in five first-class matches for Border from 1910/11 to 1913/14.

See also
 List of Border representative cricketers

References

External links
 

1891 births
1962 deaths
South African cricketers
Border cricketers
Cricketers from Port Elizabeth